2202 Pele, provisional designation , is an eccentric asteroid and near-Earth object of the Amor group, approximately 1–2 kilometers in diameter.

It was discovered by American astronomer Arnold Klemola at the U.S. Lick Observatory on Mount Hamilton, California, on 7 September 1972. The asteroid was named after Pele from native Hawaiian religion.

Orbit and classification 

Pele orbits the Sun at a distance of 1.1–3.5 AU once every 3 years and 6 months (1,265 days). Its orbit has an eccentricity of 0.51 and an inclination of 9° with respect to the ecliptic.

It is an Amor asteroid, the second largest subgroup of near-Earth objects, that approach the orbit of Earth from beyond, but does not cross it.

No precoveries were taken. The asteroid's observation arc starts two days after the official discovery observation.

Physical characteristics 

As of 2017, Peles effective size, composition, and albedo, as well as its rotation period and shape remain unknown. It measures between 1 and 2 kilometers, based on a generic magnitude-to-diameter conversion, which assumes an albedo in the range of 0.05 to 0.25.

Naming 

This minor planet was named after Pele, the goddess of fire, lightning, and volcanoes from Hawaiian mythology. Pele created the Hawaiian Islands and made Kīlauea her home, after she was forced to go away by her rival sister and goddess of the sea, Nāmaka. The official naming citation was published by the Minor Planet Center on 1 June 1980.

References

External links 
 Asteroid Lightcurve Database (LCDB), query form (info )
 Dictionary of Minor Planet Names, Google books
 Asteroids and comets rotation curves, CdR – Observatoire de Genève, Raoul Behrend
 
 
 

002202
Discoveries by Arnold Klemola
Named minor planets
19720907